William Tokarsky is an American character actor known for his recurring role as Len on Welcome to Flatch. He is also known for playing the Demon William on the Adult Swim series Your Pretty Face Is Going to Hell, and the Killer in the cult film Too Many Cooks.

Career
Tokarsky began acting following retirement from a job at General Motors in Doraville, Georgia. While visiting the film set for Get Low to catch a glimpse of its stars, Robert Duvall and Bill Murray, Tokarsky spoke with some extras and decided that acting "looked like fun". His first roles were bit parts in The Hunger Games: Catching Fire and Anchorman 2: The Legend Continues. Following his role as William the Demon on the Adult Swim series Your Pretty Face Is Going to Hell, Tokarsky was cast as the killer Bill in the short film Too Many Cooks.

In a 2015 article about Adult Swim for the British newspaper The Guardian, it was mentioned that tourists took photos of "William Tokarsky’s grim face, as he reprises his role from Adult Swim’s 70s and 80s sitcom title-sequence parody Too Many Cooks."

In 2015, a life cast mold of Tokarsky was made by Silver Scream FX Lab.

Filmography

References

External links

American male film actors
1948 births
Living people
Male actors from Pittsburgh